WKLY (FM104.1 & 980 AM) is a radio station broadcasting a country music format. It is licensed to Hartwell, Georgia, United States.  The station is owned by Bryan and Bruce Hicks and features programming from ABC Radio and Westwood One.
It is the home of Hart County High School Sports and University of Georgia sports.  Some of the morning show programming includes, the WKLY sports wrap show as well as the Swap Shop. WKLY also airs Contemporary Christian Music at night and an all gospel Sunday featuring southern gospel. The morning show anchor is Mike Atkins, he has been with the station for more than 30 years. Listeners can also hear the Dave Ramsey Show weeknights at 7:06.

References

External links

KLY
Radio stations established in 1947
1970 establishments in Georgia (U.S. state)
Country radio stations in the United States
Hart County, Georgia